Annie Hart is an American film composer, keyboardist, songwriter and vocalist.  She primarily composes and performs in the band Au Revoir Simone.  In 2017, she released a solo album entitled Impossible Accomplice. She has contributed vocals to other artists' projects and appeared on the 2017 series of Twin Peaks.  She has composed and performed the score of Banana Split (2018) and, along with Jay Wadley, Olympic Dreams (2020).

History 
Hart was born on Long Island, New York, and is one of three founding members of synth-pop group Au Revoir Simone.  She has been in other groups including Uninhabitable Mansions, featuring members of Clap Your Hands Say Yeah, and collaborated as a composer with French band Air for their soundtrack to Les Voyages Dans La Lune.  In 2017, she began releasing music under her own name apart from Au Revoir Simone and embarked on a world tour.

She has appeared on screen along with the other members of Au Revoir Simone in Episodes 4 and 9 of the 2017 series of Twin Peaks.  Her song "Hard To Be Still" appeared on episode one of the Netflix series Gypsy, starring Naomi Watts.

Musical style 
Hart's music is considered minimal synth-pop, which New York magazine's Bedford and Bowery describes as "resonant, tender, and not too sweet".  She primarily composes on electric piano and vintage synthesizers.

Discography

with Au Revoir Simone 
 2005: Verses of Comfort, Assurance & Salvation (Europe: Moshi Moshi Records, North America: Our Secret Record Company, Japan: Rallye Record Label)
 2007: The Bird of Music (Europe: Moshi Moshi Records, North America: Our Secret Record Company, Japan: Rallye Record Label)
 2009: Still Night, Still Light (North America: Our Secret Record Company)
 2013: Move in Spectrums (Europe: Moshi Moshi Records, North America: Instant Records)

with Uninhabitable Mansions 
 2009: We Misplaced a Cobra in the Uninhabitable Mansion 7-inch single
 2009: Nature is a Taker LP

with Jeffrey Lewis 
 2011: A Turn In The Dream Songs "Reaching" (Rough Trade)

with Air 
 2011: Le Voyage Dans La Lune  "Who Am I Now?" (EMI)

Solo 
 2017: Impossible Accomplice (Instant Records)
 2019: A Softer Offering
 2021: Everything Pale Blue (Orindal Records)

References 

Year of birth missing (living people)
Living people
American women singer-songwriters
People from Long Island
American women in electronic music
21st-century American keyboardists
American singer-songwriters
21st-century American women